The 2010 FIFA World Cup qualification UEFA Group 4 was a UEFA qualifying group for the 2010 FIFA World Cup. The group comprised 2006 FIFA World Cup hosts Germany along with Russia, Finland, Wales, Azerbaijan and Liechtenstein.

The group was won by Germany, who qualified for the 2010 FIFA World Cup. The runners-up Russia entered the UEFA play-off stage.

Standings

Matches
The fixtures for the group were determined on 10 January 2008, after a meeting between representatives of each nation in Frankfurt, Germany. The August 2009 date in the international match calendar was moved forward by one week, from 19 August 2009 to 12 August 2009, at the FIFA Executive Committee meeting on 27 May 2008.

Goalscorers
There were 74 goals scored over the 30 games, an average of 2.46 goals per game.

7 goals
 Miroslav Klose

6 goals
 Lukas Podolski

5 goals
 Jonatan Johansson 
 Roman Pavlyuchenko

4 goals
 Michael Ballack

3 goals
 Bastian Schweinsteiger
 Andrei Arshavin
 Konstantin Zyryanov

2 goals

 Vagif Javadov
 Elvin Mammadov
 Mikael Forssell
 Aleksandr Kerzhakov
 David Edwards

1 goal

 Shefki Kuqi
 Jari Litmanen
 Niklas Moisander
 Roni Porokara
 Daniel Sjölund
 Hannu Tihinen
 Mika Väyrynen
 Thomas Hitzlsperger
 Marcell Jansen
 Simon Rolfes
 Piotr Trochowski
 Heiko Westermann
 Mario Frick
 Michele Polverino
 Vasili Berezutski
 Sergei Ignashevich
 Pavel Pogrebnyak
 Igor Semshov
 Craig Bellamy
 James Collins
 Joe Ledley
 Aaron Ramsey
 David Vaughan
 Sam Vokes

1 own goal
 Petri Pasanen (playing against Russia)
 Veli Lampi (playing against Russia)
 Mario Frick (playing against Wales)
 Ashley Williams (playing against Germany)

Attendances

References

4
2008–09 in Welsh football
2009–10 in Welsh football
2008 in Russian football
2009 in Russian football
2008–09 in German football
Qual
2009 in Finnish football
2008 in Finnish football
2008–09 in Liechtenstein football
2009–10 in Liechtenstein football
2008–09 in Azerbaijani football
2009–10 in Azerbaijani football